Luka Mezgec (born 27 June 1988) is a Slovenian road bicycle racer, who currently rides for UCI WorldTeam . After scoring numerous podium finishes in 2013, Mezgec finally tasted victory on the fifth stage of the Tour of Beijing. He was named in the start list for the 2015 Vuelta a España.

In August 2020, he was named in the startlist for the 2020 Tour de France.

Major results
Source:

2009
 1st Vzpon na Mohor
2010
 1st  Overall Coupe des nations Ville Saguenay
 5th Overall Course de la Solidarité Olympique
2011
 1st Memoriał Henryka Łasaka
 1st Stage 1 Istrian Spring Trophy
 2nd GP Kranj
 2nd VN HiFi-Color Studio
 3rd Banja Luka–Beograd II
 3rd Central European Tour Budapest GP
 6th Ljubljana–Zagreb
 8th Overall Rhône-Alpes Isère Tour
 8th Banja Luka–Beograd I
 10th Central European Tour Miskolc GP
2012
 2nd Memorijal Nevio Valčić
 2nd Banja Luka–Beograd I
 2nd Memoriał Henryka Łasaka
 3rd Poreč Trophy
 3rd Central European Tour Budapest GP
 3rd Ljubljana–Zagreb
 3rd Trofeo Gianfranco Bianchin
 4th Banja Luka–Beograd II
 4th Grand Prix of Moscow
 5th Road race, National Road Championships
 5th Overall Five Rings of Moscow
1st  Points classification
1st Stage 5
 5th Grand Prix Südkärnten
 5th Central European Tour Miskolc GP
 5th Coupe des Carpathes
 6th Overall Tour of Qinghai Lake
1st  Points classification
1st Stages 2, 4, 6, 11 & 13
2013
 1st Stage 5 Tour of Beijing
 2nd Halle–Ingooigem
 7th Handzame Classic
2014
 1st Handzame Classic
 Volta a Catalunya
1st Stages 1, 2 & 5
 1st Stage 21 Giro d'Italia
 1st Stage 1 Tour of Beijing
 2nd Road race, National Road Championships
 2nd Kampioenschap van Vlaanderen
2015
 1st Stage 2 Tour du Haut Var
2016
 2nd Road race, National Road Championships
 9th Paris–Tours
2017
 1st  Road race, National Road Championships
 1st  National MTB XC Championships
 1st  National CX Championships
 1st Arnhem–Veenendaal Classic
 1st Stage 2 Tour of Slovenia
 5th Road race, UEC European Road Championships
2019
 Tour of Slovenia
1st  Points classification
1st Stage 2
 Tour de Pologne
1st Stages 2 & 5
 3rd Clásica de Almería
 8th Road race, UEC European Road Championships
 8th Three Days of Bruges–De Panne
2020
 1st  Sprints classification, Tour de Pologne
 2nd Bretagne Classic
 5th Clásica de Almería
2021
 3rd Road race, National Road Championships
2022
 3rd Road race, National Road Championships
 6th Road race, UEC European Road Championships

Grand Tour general classification results timeline

References

External links

1988 births
Living people
Slovenian male cyclists
Slovenian Giro d'Italia stage winners
Sportspeople from Kranj